Visa requirements for Algerian citizens are administrative entry restrictions by the authorities of other states placed on citizens of Algeria. As of 2 July 2019, Algerian citizens had visa-free or visa on arrival access to 55 countries and territories, ranking the Algerian passport 92nd in terms of travel freedom (tied with the passport of Jordan) according to the Henley Passport Index.


Visa requirements map

Visa requirements

Dependent, disputed, or restricted territories
Unrecognized or partially recognized countries

Dependent and autonomous territories

See also

 Visa policy of Algeria
 Algerian passport

References and Notes
References

Notes

Algeria
Foreign relations of Algeria